Hervé Le Marchand (1 May 1960 – 3 January 2023), better known by the stage name of Mimosa, was a French humorous magician.

Biography
Le Marchand was a student at the École Centrale Paris, where he was a member of the circus and magic club, graduating in 1985 after partaking in the Gala des grandes écoles. After his graduation, he worked as a computer engineer while continuing to practice magic.

In 1989, Le Marchand won the first prize at the Festival mondial du cirque de demain in Paris. He then dedicated himself full-time to magic, winning circus prizes in Geneva and Norway.

Le Marchand was married to a Thai woman and spent three months out of each year in Japan. He died in Paris on 3 January 2023, at the age of 62.

References

1960 births
2023 deaths
École Centrale Paris alumni
French magicians
People from Lannion